Naalai Namadhe may refer to:
 Naalai Namadhe (1975 film), an Indian Tamil-language masala film
 Naalai Namadhe (2009 film), a Tamil-language drama film